Chauffard is a French surname. Notable people with the surname include:

Anatole Chauffard (1855–1932), French physician
René-Jean Chauffard (1920–1972), French actor

French-language surnames